Netbarrier X4 is a discontinued version of the Intego Netbarrier line of its firewall for OS X. It features a cookie cleaner, a browser history cleaner, internet traffic statistic, an Internet bandwidth meter, cookie filters and information hiding. The firewall is customizable, with already configured options: "No Restrictions", "No Network", "Client (Local Server)", "Server Only", "Client Only", and "Customized".  The "Customized" option allows flexible firewall configuration. 

NetBarrier's features have been integrated into VirusBarrier X6, and it is no longer sold as a standalone product.

References
http://www.intego.com/netbarrier/
http://www.macworld.com/article/50970/2006/05/netbarrierx4.html

Firewall software